Vielmur-sur-Agout (literally Vielmur on Agout) is a commune in the Tarn department and Occitania region of southern France.

See also
Communes of the Tarn department

References

Communes of Tarn (department)